James A. Suffridge (February 2, 1909 – June 7, 2001) was an American labor unionist.

Born in Knoxville, Tennessee, Suffridge's father encouraged him to box as a child.  James then followed his father in becoming a grocer, moving to Oakland, California, where he joined the Retail Clerks International Union (RCIU).  He was soon elected as leader of his local, in which role he encouraged Asian Americans to join the union, while they were often excluded from other unions.  He also became known for making compromises with large grocery chains, in exchange for them permitting their workers to unionize.

In 1944, Suffridge was elected as president of the RCIU, moving to the top position of secretary-treasurer in 1947.  He moved the union's headquarters to Lafayette, Indiana, and then to Washington D.C..  In 1953, the union decided to make the presidency its senior position, and Suffridge moved back into it.  He came to national prominence, and in 1961 went on an international goodwill tour with Lyndon B. Johnson.  He was elected as president of the International Federation of Commercial, Clerical, and Technical Employees in 1964.

Suffridge retired from the RCIU in 1968, and from the international federation two years later.  He moved to Fort Myers, Florida, where he was active in the Shriners and played golf.

References

1909 births
2001 deaths
American trade union leaders
People from Knoxville, Tennessee